Samuel Thompson Busey (November 16, 1835 – August 12, 1909) was a U.S. Representative from Illinois.

Biography
Samuel Busey was born in Greencastle, Indiana but moved with his parents to Urbana, Illinois. He attended the public schools and went on to study law where he attended commercial college and law lectures in 1859 and 1860.

During the Civil War he served as first sergeant and then first lieutenant of the Urbana Zouaves in 1861 and 1862.

He was appointed Town collector in 1862 and became a second lieutenant in the recruiting service in June 1862 and helped to organize the Seventy-sixth Regiment, Illinois Volunteer Infantry where he served as captain of Company B of that regiment June 22, 1862.

He later served as a lieutenant colonel August 22, 1862 and was promoted to colonel January 7, 1863.

On July 20, 1866, President Andrew Johnson nominated Busey for appointment to the grade of brevet brigadier general of volunteers, to rank from April 9, 1865, and the United States Senate confirmed the appointment on July 26, 1866.

He mustered out of the service July 22, 1865, in Chicago, Illinois and engaged in banking from 1867 to 1888. He later served as mayor of Urbana 1880–1889.

Busey was elected as a Democrat to the Fifty-second Congress (March 4, 1891 – March 3, 1893) defeating Joseph Gurney Cannon.

He was an unsuccessful candidate for reelection in 1892 to the Fifty-third Congress, losing to Cannon (who regained his seat). This pattern would be repeated 22 years later by fellow Democrat banker Frank T. O'Hair.

After, his failed reelection he returned to banking.

He died in a boating accident in Mantrap Township, Hubbard County, Minnesota August 12, 1909 while on a family vacation. His niece, Annie McClain, was killed in the same accident. He was interred in Woodlawn Cemetery, Urbana, Illinois.

See also

List of American Civil War brevet generals (Union)

References

 Retrieved on 2008-10-19

1835 births
1909 deaths
Union Army colonels
Democratic Party members of the United States House of Representatives from Illinois
Accidental deaths in Minnesota
People from Greencastle, Indiana
People from Urbana, Illinois
Boating accident deaths
19th-century American politicians
Military personnel from Illinois